Study for Cardinal Niccolò Albergati is a silverpoint drawing attributed to the Early Netherlandish painter Jan van Eyck, made in preparation for his Portrait of Cardinal Niccolò Albergati of 1431. Niccolò Albergati was a diplomat working under Pope Martin V. He met van Eyck during a peace congress in Antwerp, when the artist portrayed him. It is held in the collection of the Staatliche Kunstsammlungen in Dresden. 

The drawing, along with the Saint Barbara in the Royal Museum of Fine Arts Antwerp and Crucifixion are the three surviving drawings by van Eyck. This work is especially valuable to art historians as it includes notes made to indicate the colors intended for the final oil portrait.

The preparatory study shows an elderly cleric who is visibly aging and imprinted with deep lines below his eyes. The work is a commission; Albergati is shown near full frontal and dressed in the red robe of a cardinal, and his gown is lined with luxurious fur.

Notes

Sources
 Ainsworth, Maryan Wynn. From Van Eyck to Bruegel: Early Netherlandish Paintings in the Metropolitan Museum of Art. NY: Metropolitan Museum of Art, 2009. 
 Borchert, Till-Holger. Van Eyck. London: Taschen, 2008. 
 Conway, Martin. "A Head of Christ by John van Eyck". The Burlington Magazine for Connoisseurs, Volume 39, No. 225, December 1921
 Harbison, Craig. Jan van Eyck, The Play of Realism. London: Reaktion Books, 1991. 

Albergati
15th-century drawings
Drawings by Jan van Eyck
Portraits by Jan van Eyck